Buddha — Rajaon Ka Raja (titled as Buddha — The King of Kings) is an Indian classical drama on Zee TV and DD National, produced by Bhupendra Kumar Modi, under the banner Spice Global. The creative producer of the show is Shetall Singh. The show first aired on Sunday, 8 September 2013 on Zee TV and Doordarshan. The programme stars Kabir Bedi in a cameo role as Asita Muni, the sage who announces the coming of Gautama Buddha. The story of the serial is based on the life of Gautama Buddha that shows how a prince, Siddhartha, became a Buddha. The role of Mayadevi - scheduled to be played by Sameksha Singh - was replaced with Deepika Upadhyay. Himanshu Soni played the lead role of Buddha, while 2010 Miss India top ten finalist, Kajal Jain played Siddhartha Gautama's wife Yaśodharā. Earlier, Ashutosh Gowariker wanted to collaborate with Shekhar Kapur for a television series on Buddha.

Cast
 Himanshu Soni as Prince Siddharth / Gautama Buddha (Known For Shakyamuni.)
 Vishesh Bansal as 10-year-old Prince Siddharth
 Sameer Dharmadhikari as Śuddhodana, Buddha and Nanda's father
 Deepika Upadhyay as Maya, Buddha's biological mother
 Gungun Uprari as Prajapati, Buddha's step mother and second wife of Suddhodana
 Kabir Bedi as Asita Muni
 Dinesh Mehta as King Pasenadi, an avid follower of Buddha
 Kajal Jain as Yaśodharā, Prince Siddharth's wife
 Ananya Agarwal as Young Yaśodharā
 Meghan Jadhav as Prince Nanda, Buddha's half-brother.
 Jagat Singh as Devadatta, Yasodhara's brother who is Buddha's enemy.
 Pravisht Mishra as Teenage Devadatta
 Devyansh Tapuriah as Child Devadatta
 Mayank Arora as Ānanda, Buddha's cousin and the primary attendant.
 Sanket Choukse as Channa, Buddha's best friend and charioteer. 
 Siddharth Vasudev as Dronadhan, Śuddhodana's second brother
 Nigaar Khan / Reshmi Ghosh as Mangala, Buddha's aunt and Dronadhan's wife
 Abhiram /Yashdeep Nain as Ajatashatru
 Hemant Choudhary as Mahamantri Udyan
 Sareeka Dhillon as Maanvika
 Ghanshyam srivastva Brahman Magadh Rajguru
 Amit Behl as Guru Vachaspati
 Surbhi Shukla as Loshika, Dasi of Prajapati
 Vandana Lalwani as Amita, Suddhodana's sister.
 Neha Kaur Uppal as Amrapali

Plot
Born as Prince Siddhartha in the 6th century BC, after years of waiting and yearning, on a full moon night, to his parents King Shuddhodana and Queen Mahamaya, he was a unique child, even at birth. Carrying the 32 signs of greatness and predicted to be the savior of humankind by some, and a mighty king of kings by others, Siddhartha proved both the prophecies to be true.

In his growing years, he was the ideal warrior prince, the pride of his father’s eyes and later to his lovely wife Yashodhara, he was the devoted and sensitive husband that all women dream of, but few are blessed with. Despite his father’s extreme protection of him from seeing suffering of any kind, lest he move towards fulfilling the latter prophecy of him being a thinker and philosopher, even as a child, Siddhartha, by his very nature, ever-questioned and pondered about all phenomena around him.

Siddhartha wondered about all things- from social to physical and natural to man-made, and he was hugely compassionate and uncompetitive by nature. Siddhartha’s questions were not born out of the natural curiosity of a young boy about the world around, but of a deeply rational yet philosophical concern for the state of the world that he saw around him, and his devastation was compounded in his youth when the wall of protection from seeing suffering that his father had built around him, crumbled.
 
Samadhi was an enlightenment, that shone not only his path on earth, but also showed the way forward for all mankind, that would illuminate the world with his teachings for thousands of years to come, as it gave birth to the Buddha-a word that today symbolizes truth, peace, love, compassion and righteousness that he stood for, like no other. It is no wonder then that there is a revival of the relevance of Buddha’s teachings and beliefs in the modern world.

Most of the early episodes in the series center around the plotting of Dronadhan, Mangala, and Devadatta - the uncle, aunt, and cousin (brother) of Siddhartha - to undermine King Shuddhodana and kill Siddhartha. Their plots always fail, and the goodness of Siddhartha always wins and grows. Much of this drama as shown in the series is not actually part of the Buddha historical writings. Though Devadatta did have a rivalry with Siddhartha, it wasn't to the extent as shown in the series, where Devadatta and his parents abuse and kill numerous people. The series also shows an extreme rivalry between Siddhartha and Devadatta for the hand in marriage of Yashodhara, even to the point of a fighting contest to determine the best warrior. However, in genuine history, Yashodhara was actually Devadatta's sister. Still, the character of Siddhartha is dramatic and moving in many ways, and shows his deep respect for all life, whether it be a person, cheetah, duck, ant or scorpion, to whom he always shows forgiveness and mercy.

Production
Nidhi Yasha (costume & jewellery) and Varsha Jain (set designer) are main crew behind the sets and costumes on the show. The first shot of Buddha was taken at the magnanimous set created at the Film City in Mumbai on the auspicious occasion of Buddha Purnima on 27 May 2013.

International broadcast

Controversies

The cable operators of Nepal banned the series' telecast as it had announced in promotional materials that the Buddha was born in India (the actual location of Kapilavastu is uncertain, with sites in both India and Nepal suggested). Following outrage on Nepalese social media, Zee TV and Kabir Bedi later apologized for the mistake.

Other controversies related to the television series involved several details that were never mentioned anywhere in the Buddhist scriptures, such as:

 The first wife of king Śuddhodana, a sterile woman, being able to bear a child after a yajna (offering to a fire) was held.
 The name of Śuddhodana's brother being Durnodhan.
 Everywhere, the existence of Brahmins is shown in the serial. The Dīgha Nikāya scripture mentions that one person asked the Buddha, "Why did the residents of Kapilavastu do not respect the Brahmins?" This suggests that the people of Kapilavastu, the city of King Śuddhodana, were atheist, like the sage Kapila himself and his followers. Kapila was considered as a predecessor of the Buddha. Therefore, the existence and guidance of Brahmins at every stage of Buddha's life, or by his father's, is away from the truth. Rhys Davis, a researcher in the subject, has mentioned that "there was not any Brahminical influence in the Sakya and Koliyas. There was not any caste system. There was not any King in Kapilvastu. There was no worship of human gods in Kapilvastu." (Part I and II)

Critical reception
Daily News and Analysis praised the performances of all the actors in Buddha, says Sameer Dharmadhikari aka Suddhodana Acting is first rated.

See also
 Buddhacarita
 Amrapali
 Aamrapali, television series
 Chanakya
 Chanakya, television series
 List of Chanakya episodes
 Little Buddha

References

External links
 Official Home Page
 Official Twitter

Indian period television series
Indian historical television series
Zee TV original programming
2013 Indian television series debuts
Television series set in Ancient India
Cultural depictions of Gautama Buddha
DD National original programming
Television series about Buddhism